Macheirocera is a genus of picture-winged flies in the family Ulidiidae.

Species
 M. grandis

References

Ulidiidae